Benedito Aparecido dos Santos, known as Massinha, (born 7 September 1939) is a Brazilian footballer. He played in four matches for the Brazil national football team in 1963. He was also part of Brazil's squad for the 1963 South American Championship.

References

1939 births
Living people
Brazilian footballers
Brazil international footballers
Association football defenders
Footballers from São Paulo (state)
People from São José do Rio Pardo